Eskivang (also Romanized as Eskīvang, Eskayūnak, Eskioonag, Eskīūnak, and Eskīvank; also known as Eskībang and Iskībang) is a village in Momenabad Rural District, in the Central District of Sarbisheh County, South Khorasan Province, Iran. At the 2006 census, its population was 356, in 92 families.

References 

Populated places in Sarbisheh County